Leon Parker Tuck (May 25, 1891 – September 2, 1953) was an American ice hockey player who competed in the 1920 Summer Olympics. Born in Melrose, Massachusetts, he was a defenseman on the United States hockey team. The team competed in the 1920 Summer Olympics, winning the silver medal.

Head coaching record

References

External links

1891 births
1953 deaths
American men's ice hockey defensemen
Boston Athletic Association ice hockey players
Dartmouth Big Green men's ice hockey coaches
Ice hockey players at the 1920 Summer Olympics
Ice hockey players from Massachusetts
Medalists at the 1920 Summer Olympics
Olympic silver medalists for the United States in ice hockey